Arkmo is an unincorporated community located in both Mississippi County, Arkansas and Dunklin County, Missouri, United States.

References

Unincorporated communities in Mississippi County, Arkansas
Unincorporated communities in Arkansas
Unincorporated communities in Dunklin County, Missouri
Unincorporated communities in Missouri